Neotermes greeni, is a species of drywood termite of the genus Neotermes. It is native to India and Sri Lanka. It closely resembles Postelectrotermes militaris. It is a minor pest of tea in Sri Lanka, and major pest of mango in India.

It is confined to upper elevations of the low country and sometimes in mid country.

Host plants
Albizia saman 
Anacardium occidentale 
Artocarpus heterophyllus 
Camellia sinensis 
Cassia multijuga 
Casuarina equisetifolia 
Crotalaria micans 
Croton laccifer
Cupressus lindleyi
Elaeocarpus serratus 
Erythrina subumbrans 
Ficus elastica 
Grevillea robusta 
Hevea brasiliensis 
Ligustrum robustum 
Litsea glutinosa 
Nephelium lappaceum
Shorea zeylanica
Spondias mombin
Toona ciliata

References

External links
Biology and control of the live-wood termites of tea
Termites on Ceylon tea estates

Termites
Insects described in 1904
Invertebrates of Sri Lanka